The Sterile Records record label was formed in London in 1979 by Nigel Ayers and Caroline K of the post-industrial music group Nocturnal Emissions. With a background in the mail art networks, their intention was to create and promote a new form of music. Sterile Records’ approach was a combination of the experiments of musique concrète and Fluxus combined with the critical eye of conceptual art and the spontaneity and energy of punk rock. The dark humour of industrial music and the incomprehensible nonsense of various ultra-leftist political fractions were an essential part of the mix.
Sterile Records used both commercial and non-commercial media to deliver anti-capitalist messages, multi-coloured noise and information overload. Growing from cassette culture, output included records and videotapes. Caroline K left the label in 1983. 
The October 2011 edition of Record Collector magazine published an article about the significance of cassette culture in the UK and listing 21 rare but sought after cassette releases, including "Standard Response".

In 1986 the label was effectively dissolved as Ayers turned his attention to setting up the Earthly Delights company.

Discography
Cassettes:

Various Standard Response SRC 1 (1979)
Tape zine compilation featuring: Leif Thuresson, Moving Finger, Lieutenant Murnau, S.M. Andrews, Cultural Amnesia, Organbank, The Nocturnal Emissions, MB, Murderwerkers, Johnny Alien, Loss of Head

The Pump Just Want to Dance SRC 2 (1980)

The Nocturnal Emissions Deathday SRC 3 (1980)

S.P.K. Live at the Crypt SRC 4 (1981)

The Nocturnal Emissions Whisky SRC 5 (1982)

Lustmord Lustmordekay SRC 6 (1983)

Nocturnal Emissions Diskinesia SRC 7 (1983)

Various Alchemy SRC 8 (1983)
Soundtrack from the Twinvision video featuring: Portion Control
SPK, Mark Pauline, P & R Rupenus, Andrew Hickinbotham, Test Dept, Robert,  
Die Todliche Doris, Nocturnal Emissions, Art Core, Walter Gramming, La Loora,  
Lustmord

Nocturnal Emissions Live at the ICA SRC 9 (1985)

Various A Joyful Noise SRC 10 (1990)
Tape zine compilation featuring: Deerpark, Fear of Thought, Blackhouse, Psyclones and Pacific 231, Nocturnal Emissions, Spanner thru ma Beatbox, Sue Ann Harkey, Xaliman and the Orchestrange, Equivalent Insecurity, Front Line Assembly, Club Dill Dough, Collectif et Cie, The Haters, FLETI, Plant Bach Ofnus, Webcore, Schuster

Vinyl:

The Nocturnal Emissions Tissue of Lies EMISS001 LP (1980)

The Nocturnal Emissions   Fruiting Body ION2 LP (1981)

MB (Maurizio Bianchi) Symphony For a Genocide SR2 LP (1981)

Lustmord Lustmord LP SR 3(1983)

The Nocturnal Emissions   Drowning in a Sea of Bliss SR4 LP  (1983)

Nocturnal Emissions    Befehlsnotstand SR5 LP (1983)

Nocturnal Emissions   Songs of Love and Revolution SR6 LP (1985) with guest vocalist Ian Bone

Nocturnal Emissions   No Sacrifice 12 inch SR7 EP (1984)

Various Here We Go SR8 LP (1985) 
A celebration of the UK Coal Miners' Strike 1984-1985 
Compilation featuring: The Larks,  Fallout, Assassins, The Band of Holy Joy, Bourbonese Qualk,  Many Happy Returns,  Nocturnal Emissions, Language, Max Closure and the Graves, The Hafler Trio,  Lustmord, Annie Anxiety and the Asexuals

Nocturnal Emissions  Shake Those Chains Rattle Those Cages SR9 LP (1985)

Konstruktivits  Glenascaul LP SR10 (1985)

Controlled Bleeding  Headcrack LP SR11 (1986)

Various Earthly Delights - a Sterile Sample SR12 LP (1986)
Compilation featuring: Eversione,  Nocturnal Emissions, D-Box, Konstruktivits, Whores of Babylon,  Reg Sailyne,  Sebastian Hellfire, Pornosect, Y.T. Looter, Moonchildren, 
R & D 28

Artists
Annie Anxiety
Bourbonese Qualk
Controlled Bleeding
Cultural Amnesia
The Hafler Trio
Konstruktivits
Lustmord
Maurizio Bianchi
Nocturnal Emissions
SPK (band)

See also
 List of record labels
 Cassette Culture

References

 Record Collector magazine October 2011
 Accessed 20 January 2008
 Interview (with Nigel Ayers) in Sounds Magazine 1983
 Extended discography
 Caroline K at Discogs.com
 Caroline K at Last FM

External links
The Sterile Records Story
 Discography at Discogs
 MusicBrainz entries for Caroline K and **Nocturnal Emissions

British record labels
Record labels established in 1979
Record labels disestablished in 1986
Industrial record labels
Cassette culture 1970s–1990s